Zakharenkov, feminine: Zakharenkova is a Russian surname ultimately derived from the given name Zakhar". Notable people with this surname include:

 (1926-1989), Russian nuclear physicist and statesman
Andrey Zakharenkov, birth name of Prokhor Chaliapin (born 1983), Russian singer
 Irina Zahharenkova (born 1976), Estonian pianist and harpsichordist
, Russian shogi player 

Russian-language surnames